The 50th Street station is a local station on the BMT West End Line of the New York City Subway, located at the intersection of 50th Street and New Utrecht Avenue in Borough Park, Brooklyn. It is served by the D train at all times. The station opened in 1916, and had its platforms extended in the 1960s.

History
50th Street station opened on June 24, 1916, along with the first portion of the BMT West End Line from 36th Street on the BMT Fourth Avenue Line to 18th Avenue station. The line was originally a surface excursion railway to Coney Island, called the Brooklyn, Bath and Coney Island Railroad, which was established in 1862, but did not reach Coney Island until 1864. Under the Dual Contracts of 1913, an elevated line was built over New Utrecht Avenue, 86th Street and Stillwell Avenue.

Station layout

This elevated station has three tracks and two side platforms. The D train stops here at all times, and the center express track is not normally used in service.

The platforms have beige windscreens and brown canopies with green frames at their center and waist-high black steel fences at either ends. They are offset as the Manhattan-bound platform is more to the north than the Coney Island-bound one and both have electrical distribution rooms at either ends.

Exits
The station's only entrance is via an elevated station house beneath the tracks that has four street stairs, two to either side of New Utrecht Avenue between 49th and 50th Streets. The station house has cherry red doors, a clad wood trim exterior, and beige interior. There are also glass block windows and heaters. The fare control consists of a token booth, turnstile bank, waiting area, and two staircases to each platform at their center.

References

External links 

 
 Station Reporter — D Train
 The Subway Nut — 50th Street Pictures 
 50th Street entrance from Google Maps Street View
 Platforms from Google Maps Street View

BMT West End Line stations
New York City Subway stations in Brooklyn
Railway stations in the United States opened in 1916
1916 establishments in New York City
Borough Park, Brooklyn